The 1919 Cleveland Indians season was their last season in Ohio League before its evolution into the American Professional Football Association. The team posted a known record of 0–2–1. Of the games that are known, the 1919 Indians are one of only a handful of teams to have never scored a point in an entire season.

Schedule

Game notes

References
Pro Football Archives: 1919 Cleveland Indians season

Cleveland Indians (NFL) seasons
Cleveland Tigers
Cleveland Tig